Zhuzhong railway station is a railway station located in Zhudong Township, Hsinchu County, Taiwan. It is located on the Neiwan line and Liujia line and is operated by the Taiwan Railways Administration.

The station was formerly an at-grade station. Between March 2007 and November 2011, the station was closed so that the station can be elevated in conjunction with the construction for the Liujia Line.

References

1947 establishments in Taiwan
Railway stations opened in 1947
Railway stations in Hsinchu County
Railway stations served by Taiwan Railways Administration